George Maye, of Canterbury, Kent, was an English politician.

Career
Active in local politics, he was Sheriff of Canterbury for 1549, an alderman by 1557 and mayor for 1557–58 and 1565–66. He was city auditor in 1564–65.

He was elected Member of Parliament (MP) for Canterbury in 1559.

References

Year of birth missing
Year of death missing
People from Canterbury
English MPs 1559
Sheriffs of Canterbury
Mayors of Canterbury